Ace Theatre in Miami, Florida, is an Art Deco commercial structure constructed in 1930 in Miami's Coconut Grove neighborhood. On July 1, 2014, the site was designated as a local historic resource. The building was added to the National Register of Historic Places June 13, 2016.

The Wolfson-Meyer Theater Company, later Wometco Enterprises, owned the theater since its construction in 1930 until 1979, when the building was purchased by Harvey Wallace. The Wallace family founded Ace Development Co., the theater's current owner.

In the 1950s, Ace Theatre was the only film venue to serve the black community in Coconut Grove.

See also
 Boulevard Theater (Miami)
 Lyric Theater (Miami)
 Tower Theater (Miami, Florida)

References

External links
 
 Ace Theatre Nomination form
 City of Miami Designation Report

National Register of Historic Places in Miami-Dade County, Florida
1930 establishments in Florida
Theatres completed in 1930
Art Deco architecture in Florida
Buildings and structures in Miami